Spring (previously known as SpringSource) was the company created by the founders of the Spring Framework (a programming model for enterprise Java applications) to support and develop Spring and related projects. Originally incorporated as Interface 21, it was renamed SpringSource in 2008 to better reflect its main business.  Over time most of the Spring developers were employed full-time by the company which offered training and consulting services to finance its activities (Spring itself is open source and is freely available to all). The company was then renamed as Spring. Recognizing that the platform of choice for most Spring applications was Apache Tomcat, Spring merged with Covalent on January 29, 2008.  Like Spring, Covalent was the financial vehicle supporting some of the developers of Tomcat.

Several other acquisitions followed: G2One (the company behind Groovy and Grails), Hyperic (who developed a tool for monitoring Java applications and their environment) and Cloud Foundry (a Platform as a Service provider). As a result, SpringSource employed some of the lead developers and committers of the Apache Tomcat, Apache HTTP Server, Hyperic, Apache Groovy and Grails open source communities.  SpringSource was also a participant in the Java Community Process.

Using these acquisitions, the company's business expanded beyond support for its application frameworks, Spring and Grails. It could now offer a suite of software products across all three stages of the enterprise Java application life cycle: build (develop), run (deploy), and manage. SpringSource created two commercial server products specifically aimed at Spring developers. TC Server is a commercial version of Tomcat integrated with Hyperic for deployment and management. DM Server was an OSGi based server which never was commercially viable. After spending millions on development with no result, it was subsequently donated to the Eclipse Foundation as the Virgo project. Both servers came with a number of customer support options.

Educational services expanded to offer training for the Spring framework, Apache Tomcat, tc Server and Groovy/Grails through its educational services unit, the SpringSource University and also a number of partner training providers.

SpringSource was purchased for $420 million by VMware in August 2009, where it was maintained for some time as a separate division within VMware.  The commercial products were rebadged as the vFabric Application Suite. Acquisitions continued including RabbitMQ (an open-source AMQP message broker), Redis (an open source, noSQL key-value store) and Gemstone (developer of several data-management products).  These products (except redis) also became part of the vFabric product set.

In April 2013, VMware, and its parent company EMC Corporation, formally created a joint venture (with GE) called Pivotal Software. All of VMware's application-oriented products, including Spring were transferred to this organization. VMWare reacquired Pivotal in 2019  and folded it into the Tanzu application suite.

VMware sold the Gemstone object database products to GemTalk Systems in May 2013. Pivotal ended their sponsorship of Groovy/Grails in March 2015.

References

External links

VMware
Defunct software companies of the United States